Erec y Enide (Erec and Enide), a 2002 novel from Manuel Vázquez Montalbán, is in a certain way a re-reading of Erec et Enide, first part of the arthurian cycle of Chrétien de Troyes.

The author analyzes three lonelinesses: the loneliness of Julio Matasanz, specialist in medieval literature; the loneliness of his wife, Madrona, and the loneliness of the couple formed by Myriam and Pedro (godson of Julio and Madrona).

Novels by Manuel Vázquez Montalbán
21st-century Spanish novels
2002 novels
Adaptations of works by Chrétien de Troyes